Norðurárdalshreppur was formerly a rural parish (hreppur) in Mýrasýsla county, west Iceland. On 11 June 1994 Norðurárdalshreppur united with Borgarnes, Hraunhreppur and Stafholtstungnahreppur under the name Borgarbyggð.

References

Populated places in Iceland